The County of Victoria is one of the 49 cadastral counties of South Australia. It was proclaimed by Governor Richard MacDonnell in 1857 and probably named for Queen Victoria. It covers an area of the Spencer Gulf coast and hinterland in the Mid North of the state from Port Pirie in the northwest to near Mount Bryan in the southeast, including most of the Broughton River watershed.

Hundreds 
The county is divided into the following 14 hundreds:
 Hundred of Pirie, established 1874
 Hundred of Wandearah, established 1874
 Hundred of Napperby, established 1874
 Hundred of Crystal Brook, established 1871
 Hundred of Howe, established 1891 (southern part of Wirrabara Forest Reserve)
 Hundred of Booyoolie, established 1871
 Hundred of Narridy, established 1871
 Hundred of Caltowie, established 1871
 Hundred of Yangya, established 1869
 Hundred of Bundaleer, established 1869
 Hundred of Belalie, established 1870
 Hundred of Reynolds, established 1869
 Hundred of Whyte, established 1869
 Hundred of Anne, established 1863

References 

Victoria